The 1993–94 Australia Tri-Nation Series (more commonly known as the 1993–94 World Series) was a One Day International (ODI) tri-series cricket tournament in Australia. The host nation's cricket team played matches against New Zealand and South Africa at six venues across Australia.

The tournament featured a quadruple round-robin tournament, with the matches being split into two groups of six matches each, and two test matches in the South African series being played at the halfway point. After twelve matches were played, Australia finished on top and took on South Africa, which finished just ahead of New Zealand by net run rate after they were both tied at seven points apiece.

In the final series, after losing the first match at the Melbourne Cricket Ground, Australia went on to win the remaining two matches played at the Sydney Cricket Ground, winning 2-1 and recording their eighth title. Mark Waugh, from Australia, finished as the leading run scorer of the tournament, with 391 runs, while teammate Shane Warne was the leading wicket-taker, with 20 wickets.

Squads

Tournament summary

First half
The series began in Melbourne under a warning, after the debacle of the warm-up match between Victoria and South Africa, which saw the run-ups being covered by rubber mats. The South Africans won the opening match of the tournament by seven wickets, with a 140-run partnership between Kepler Wessels (70) and Hansie Cronje (91) securing the victory. This was despite Australia bringing in Shane Warne after Tim May was ruled out with a hamstring muscle strain. After the match at Adelaide Oval between New Zealand and South Africa was washed out without a ball being played, Australia recorded their first victory of the series as they defeated New Zealand by eight wickets. This was due to part to Glenn McGrath and Warne each taking four wickets as they bowled New Zealand out for only 135, and in part to Matthew Hayden scoring a half-century in what was first ODI in Australia.

When the tournament moved to Sydney, Australia recorded their second victory in a row with a rout of South Africa on a pitch that Captain Allan Border called "shocking". This was after South Africa was bowled for 69, with Paul Reiffel taking four wickets for 13 runs in his eight overs to lose by 103 runs. Australia went on to win the match played at Melbourne, with the host team winning by 3 runs over New Zealand on the back of a 81-run innings from Mark Taylor, as Steve Waugh tore a hamstring and was ruled out for the first two tests against South Africa. In Hobart, South Africa could only muster 7/147 from their fifty overs on what The Age described as a 200-run pitch. This was helped by good bowling from man-of-the-match Gavin Larsen (2/12) and Chris Pringle (3/28). New Zealand, with Brendan Young the top scorer with 74, chased the target with four wickets to spare.

Second half
After the first two tests of the South African series were played in Melbourne and Sydney, the tournament restarted at the Gabba, in Brisbane, for the second half of the tournament. New Zealand, with the partnership of Shane Thomson (68) and Chris Cairns (70), would get to 7/256, which would be the highest score of the tournament. They would go on to win by nine runs in a revised target of 227, despite Peter Kirsten (97). South Africa would suffer another defeat, this time to Australia only one day later, as 98 runs in 158 minutes from Dean Jones led Australia to a 48-run win. The following match, played at the Sydney Cricket Ground, saw a controversial not-out call when umpire Steve Davis rejected a straight forward catch from Ken Rutherford batting to Shane Warne. Allan Border stated that it was an out and called for the umpires to use common sense. This call would later be costly, with Rutherford scoring 65 and, with the help of Chris Pringle who took four wickets, leading New Zealand to a 13-run win over Australia.

Two matches were then played at Perth's WACA. In the first match, three wickets from Brian McMillan and Allan Donald (two being in the first over) helped South Africa record a five-wicket victory with twenty overs left to spare as they chased down the 151 set by New Zealand. The second match was another South African victory, this time over a weakened Australia, which didn't have Ian Healy as wicket keeper, as he had been replaced by Tim Zoehrer. Other health issues included Peter Kirsten being hit on the side of the face, with X-ray scans showing two fractures of his cheek bone. The final match of the group stage saw an 121-run partnership between Boon and Dean Jones, as they led Australia to 3/217 on a slow outfield. In response, New Zealand could muster only 166, with Bryan Young the top scorer with 45, as Warne took three wickets. This meant that South Africa qualified through to the finals by net run rate.

Final series 
The final series of matches started at the Melbourne Cricket Ground, with Craig McDermott being brought back into the lineup for Australia, while Peter Kirsten was put in the lineup for South Africa despite the facial bone fractures he received in the previous match. In the opening match, a century from Gary Kirsten and a five-wicket haul from Richard Snell guided the visitors to a 28-run victory, as they opened up a 1-0 series lead heading into the Sydney matches. The first match of two at the Sydney Cricket Ground saw an partnership of 175 between Mark Waugh (107) and Jones (79) as they led Australia to 6/247 from their fifty overs. "Purple patch" performances from bowlers Warne (3/4 from 15 balls) and McDermott (3/6 from eight balls) would help in bowling out South Africa for 178, 69 runs short of the target. This was despite a half century from Jonty Rhodes. The final match saw Australia win by 35 runs in Border's 100th match as captain in the tri-series. Half centuries from Mark Waugh (who was named player of the final series) and Boon got Australia to 223, which South Africa wouldn't reach as they only scored 9/188.

Points table

Results

Final series

Statistics
Mark Waugh finished the tournament with the most runs in the series, 524, which included a century in the second final against South Africa. He finished ahead of fellow Australian batsmen David Boon and Dean Jones. South African players Gary Kirsten and Hansie Cronje rounded out the top five. Shane Warne ended the series as the leading wicket taker, with 20 wickets from ten matches. He was followed by fellow Australian Glenn McGrath, who ended up with the same number of wickets as Kiwi bowler Chris Pringle. South African Fanie de Villiers and Australian Paul Reiffel rounded out the top five.

Most runs

Most wickets

References

External links
 Series home at Cricinfo

Australian Tri-Series
1993 in Australian cricket
1993 in New Zealand cricket
1993 in South African cricket
1993–94 Australian cricket season
1994 in Australian cricket
1994 in New Zealand cricket
1994 in South African cricket
International cricket competitions from 1991–92 to 1994
1993–94
1993–94